Clarence Alfred Barnes (August 28, 1882 – May 26, 1970) was an American politician who served as attorney general of Massachusetts from 1945 to 1949.

Barnes political career began in Mansfield, Massachusetts, where he served as town counsel and moderator of the Town meeting. From 1912 to 1913, he served as a state representative, and he was a delegate to the Massachusetts Constitutional Convention of 1917–18.

Barnes was the Republican nominee for attorney general in 1938 but lost to incumbent Paul A. Dever. He ran again in 1940, but lost the Republican nomination to Robert T. Bushnell. Barnes was a member of the Massachusetts Governor's Council from 1943 to 1944. In 1944, he defeated former Lieutenant Governor Francis E. Kelly to become attorney general. Barnes defeated Kelly again in 1946, but lost to him in 1948. He was a candidate for governor in 1950, but lost the nomination to Arthur W. Coolidge. Barnes was also a delegate to the Republican National Convention in 1940, 1944, 1948, and 1952.
-
Barnes died on May 26, 1970, at Martha's Vineyard Hospital in Oak Bluffs, Massachusetts.

His son Clare Barnes, Jr. was an advertising executive who published a best-selling series of picture books.

References

1882 births
1970 deaths
20th-century American politicians
Massachusetts Attorneys General
Members of the Massachusetts Governor's Council
Members of the Massachusetts House of Representatives
People from Mansfield, Massachusetts
People from Martha's Vineyard, Massachusetts
Politicians from Brooklyn
Yale College alumni
Yale Law School alumni